Neodactylota is a genus of moth in the family Gelechiidae.

Species
 Neodactylota basilica Hodges, 1966
 Neodactylota egena Hodges, 1966
 Neodactylota liguritrix Hodges, 1966
 Neodactylota snellenella (Walsingham, 1888)

References

Gelechiini